The 1895 Elmira Athletic Club football team was an American football team that represented the Elmira Athletic Club of New York as an independent during the 1895 football season. The team compiled a 6–2 record, shut out three opponents, and outscored their opponents by a total of 85 to 46.

Schedule

References

Elmira Athletic Club
Athletic Club football teams and seasons
Elmira Athletic Club football